Clarence Skinner (13 October 1900 – 2 February 1969) was a Barbadian cricketer. He played in one first-class match for the Barbados cricket team in 1935/36.

See also
 List of Barbadian representative cricketers

References

External links
 

1900 births
1969 deaths
Barbadian cricketers
Barbados cricketers
People from Saint Peter, Barbados